The thirty-third edition of the Caribbean Series (Serie del Caribe) was a baseball competition played in . It was held from February 2 through February 9 with the champion teams from the Dominican Republic, Tigres del Licey; Mexico, Potros de Tijuana; Puerto Rico, Cangrejeros de Santurce, and Venezuela, Cardenales de Lara. All games were held at Bobby Maduro Stadium in Miami, Florida.

Summary
Unlike previous years, the four teams played a six-game round robin schedule, each team facing the other teams once, followed by a three-game playoff round and a best-of-three series.

This time, the Tigres del Licey became the first Dominican Republic club to clinch two Caribbean Series titles with an undefeated record. The Tigres had won its first title in 1971 edition. As a result, Licey is the only team with an undefeated record in three editions of the Series.

Licey, with John Roseboro at the helm, won the Series behind a strong offensive outburst and fine pitching performance, outscoring its rivals 50–8 to set a Series record. In the first round, the Dominican team defeated Puerto Rico 8–2, blanked Mexico 4–0, and crushed Venezuela 12–1. Then, they extended their overwhelming dominance over Venezuela in the final round with scores of 13–4 and 13–1.

Outfielders Gerónimo Berroa (.479 BA) and Jerry Brooks (.473) led the Series hitters and shared MVP honors. Licey also received offensive support from Henry Rodríguez, Andújar Cedeño, Francisco Cabrera, Gilberto Reyes, Juan Bell and Silvestre Campusano. The pitching staff was headed by Mélido Pérez, who posted a 2-0 record and a perfect 0.00 ERA in 12 innings pitched.

Other contributions came from Juan Guzmán (1-0, 2.35 ERA, 7⅔ IP) and Efraín Valdez (1-0, 0.00 ERA, 6.0 IP), being backed by a bullpen that featured Rod Beck, Jeff Hartsock, Mel Rojas and José Tapia. Also in the roster were Pedro Astacio, Braulio Castillo, Stan Javier and José Rijo.

Each of the remaining teams finished 1-2 in the round-robin part of the tournament, leading to a semi final playoff in which Venezuela beat both Mexico and Puerto Rico once each. The Venezuelan Cardenales de Lara included players as Luis Aponte, Willie Banks, Derek Bell, William Cañate, Giovanni Carrara, Tony Castillo, José Escobar, Tobias Hernández, Alexis Infante, Randy Knorr, Robert Pérez, Luis Sojo, Mike Timlin and Mark Whiten.

The Mexican Potros de Tijuana recorded their lone win against Venezuela during the round-robin with a 10-hit, 3–0 shutout, on a combined pitching effort. Their roster included Matías Carrillo, Vinny Castilla, Tommy Hinzo, José Tolentino and Ray Torres, among others.
 
Puerto Rico's Cangrejeros de Santurce disappointed, even though they fielded an impressive squad which included Eric Anthony, Luis Aquino, Kevin Brown, Jacob Brumfield, Casey Candaele, Mike Cubbage, Carlos Delgado, Tony Fossas, Leo Gómez, Mark Lemke, Jaime Navarro, Andy Tomberlin and David West. The Cangrejeros defeated Tijuana, 6–1, for their only victory in the tournament.

The playing format, which was named Winterball I, was not used again in the Series.

Final standings

Individual leaders

All-Star Team

See also
Ballplayers who have played in the Series

Sources
 Nuñez, José Antero (1994). Serie del Caribe de la Habana a Puerto La Cruz. JAN Editor. 
 Bjarman, Peter (1994). Baseball with a Latin Beat : A History of the Latin American Game. McFarland & Company. 
 Bjarkman, Peter (2005). Diamonds around the Globe: The Encyclopedia of International Baseball. Greenwood Publishing Group. 
 Van Hyning, Thomas E. (2008). The Santurce Crabbers: Sixty Seasons of Puerto Rican Winter League Baseball. McFarland & Company.

External links
Hoy Digital – Henry, Berroa y Mélido: figuras claves en victoria Licey en 1991 (Spanish)
Series del Caribe en Miami – Naranjeros de Hermosillo (Spanish)

Caribbean
1991
1991 in American sports
1991 in sports in Florida
1991 in Caribbean sport
Baseball competitions in Miami